Ato Hand (born June 30, 1975) is a former American judoka who competed in the 2000 Summer Olympics.

References

1975 births
Living people
American male judoka
Olympic judoka of the United States
Judoka at the 2000 Summer Olympics
People from Tallahassee, Florida
Pan American Games medalists in judo
Pan American Games bronze medalists for the United States
Judoka at the 1999 Pan American Games
Medalists at the 1999 Pan American Games